Dorset and East Devon was a European Parliament constituency covering all of Dorset in England, with the exception of Christchurch, plus parts of eastern Devon.

Prior to its uniform adoption of proportional representation in 1999, the United Kingdom used first-past-the-post for the European elections in England, Scotland and Wales. The European Parliament constituencies used under that system were smaller than the later regional constituencies and only had one Member of the European Parliament each.

It consisted of the Westminster Parliament constituencies (on their 1983 boundaries) of Bournemouth East, Bournemouth West, Honiton, North Dorset, Poole, South Dorset, and West Dorset.

The constituency replaced parts of Devon, Somerset and West Dorset and Dorset East and Hampshire West.  It became part of the much larger South West England constituency in 1999.

Members of the European Parliament

Results

|- style="background-color:#F6F6F6"
! style="background-color: " |
| colspan="2"   | New creation:  win.
| align="right" | Swing
| align="right" | N/A
||

References

External links
 David Boothroyd's United Kingdom Election Results 

European Parliament constituencies in England (1979–1999)
Politics of Devon
Politics of Dorset
1994 establishments in England
1999 disestablishments in England
Constituencies established in 1994
Constituencies disestablished in 1999